Giants & Elephants is a collaboration album by American rappers Guce & J. Stalin, released on 21 July 2009. It peaked at #61 on the R&B/Hip-Hop Albums chart. Giants & Elephants is Guce's most successful album to date, and his first appearance on that chart since 1994's Peer Pressure. It features a guest appearance from Currensy.

Music videos has been filmed for "Another Quelo" featuring Shady Nate and "Use a Chick" featuring Killa Keise (who was shot and killed 2 1/2 years after the album's release), Shady Nate, Philthy Rich, Beeda Weeda and Young Jun3.

Track listing

Note: There is a 17th track entitled "What's Next", but is not included on the CD version of the album.

References

2009 albums
Collaborative albums
J. Stalin albums